Girdhari Lal Bhargava (11 November 1936 – 8 March 2009) was a member of the Lok Sabha (lower house of parliament) in India. A member of the Bharatiya Janata Party, he was elected six consecutive times for the Jaipur constituency of Rajasthan. He defeated Bhawani Singh by nearly 100,000 votes and thereafter had margins always above 100,000 votes.
He was sometimes called 'scooter wale neta ji' 
He died on 8 March 2009 from a heart attack while he was visiting Ahmedabad.He was from a brahmin family

Positions held

Winning of Jaipur constituency

References

External links
 Official biographical sketch - Parliament of India website

1936 births
2009 deaths
India MPs 2004–2009
Politicians from Jaipur
India MPs 1989–1991
India MPs 1991–1996
India MPs 1996–1997
India MPs 1998–1999
India MPs 1999–2004
Lok Sabha members from Rajasthan
Rajasthan MLAs 1977–1980
Bharatiya Janata Party politicians from Rajasthan